Los Gringos Locos (intended to mean The Crazy Americans in English) were a lucha libre stable in Asistencia Asesoría y Administración (AAA). The stable was originally a tag team consisting of Eddie Guerrero and Art Barr.

Gimmick
Los Gringos Locos was intended to be the Mexican version of the Four Horsemen alliance in American promotion World Championship Wrestling. Because Barr was American and Guerrero was Mexican-American, they were able to draw heat from Mexican crowds as they acted more and more American. The team wore red, white, and blue wrestling attire.

History

La Pareja del Terror
The stable began as the tag team La Pareja del Terror (The Pair of Terror) made up of Eddy Guerrero and the "Love Machine" Art Barr.

At first the two men did not get along behind the scenes, but they decided to team up for business reasons. Guerrero, however, was teaming with El Hijo del Santo at the time. Guerrero's brother Mando came up with the idea of Guerrero turning on Santo and aligning himself with Barr as villains. Barr and Guerrero met with AAA's owner Antonio Peña, who gave them the green light on the storyline. The duo was originally known as the American Machine and then La Pareja del Terror, but their name was changed to Los Gringos Locos after the announcers said "Those gringos are loco," in regards to the team. Los Gringos feuded primarily with El Hijo del Santo and Octagón. On November 5, 1993, Santo and Octagón defeated them to become the inaugural IWC/AAA World Tag Team Champions. Barr and Guerrero, however, defeated them for the championship in July. Meanwhile, as they continued to team together, Guerrero and Barr began to become good friends.

Becoming a stable
As Los Gringos Locos became more popular in Mexico, AAA's owner Antonio Peña and top star Konnan decided to turn the team into an alliance of several wrestlers. Backstage, both Guerrero and Barr were against the idea of expanding the team, but agreed to it if they could have a say in who was allowed to join the stable. Konnan was the first to join the team, and at the suggestion of Guerrero and Barr, Black Cat was the second. The stable continued to grow to include Madonna's Boyfriend (Louie Spicolli), Chicano Power, and El Misterioso.

The team continued to feud with El Hijo del Santo and Octagón, but the rivalry ended in a Hair vs. Mask match at the first lucha pay-per-view in America, When Worlds Collide, which they lost. Barr convinced Antonio Peña that he be included in the match, which was originally supposed to be Guerrero against Santo. Barr and Guerrero both received $7,500 for their part in the match.

In the United States, Paul Heyman, the promoter of Extreme Championship Wrestling (ECW), began negotiating with Barr and Guerrero in hopes of bringing the team into his promotion. At the time, rumors circulated that Heyman planned to have Barr and Guerrero feud with The Public Enemy. The duo were looking to work outside of Mexico as the Peso had been devalued, which had caused a dramatic decrease in their pay. On November 23, 1994, however, Barr died from a drug-related heart attack. After his death, the team was forced to vacate the IWC/AAA World Tag Team Championship.

Championships and accomplishments
Asistencia Asesoría y Administración
AAA World Tag Team Championship (1 time) - Guerrero and Barr
Pro Wrestling Illustrated
PWI ranked Guerrero and Barr #18 of the 100 best tag teams of the "PWI Years" in 2003
Wrestling Observer Newsletter
Feud of the Year (1994) Los Gringos Locos vs. AAA
Tag Team of the Year (1994) Guerrero and Barr

Footnotes

References

Lucha Libre AAA Worldwide teams and stables